Northern Irish heraldry follows the heraldic traditions of Ireland and England.

At the College of Arms, the Norroy and Ulster King of Arms upholds the responsibility for Northern Ireland since 1943.

References